Thomas A. Ledwith (February 14, 1840 in New York City – April 1, 1898 in New York City) was an American lawyer and politician from New York.

Life
He graduated from St. Francis Xavier College in 1856. Then he studied law, was admitted to the bar in 1861, and practiced in New York City.

He was a member of the New York State Assembly (New York Co., 11th D.) in 1863. He was elected a New York City Police Justice (8th D.) in 1863, and re-elected in 1869. In 1870, he ran for Mayor of New York City but was defeated by Tammany man A. Oakey Hall. In 1871, he ran unsuccessfully for the New York Supreme Court (1st D.).

He was a member of the New York State Senate (7th D.) in 1874 and 1875.

He married Agnes McGowan (March 1, 1843 New York City, August 6, 1868 New York City) on April 11, 1866. They had one son, 
Joseph Ledwith (June 26, 1868 New York City, December 27, 1929 Bethel, Connecticut). He married Lucy A.Donahue ( November, 1853 New York City, January 28, 1941, New York City) and they had three children, Thomas Augustine, Mary and Frances.

He died at his home, at 28 West 72nd Street in New York City, and was buried at the Calvary Cemetery in Woodside, Queens.

Sources
 Biographical Sketches of the State Officers and the Members of the Legislature of the State of New York in 1862 and '63 by William D. Murphy (1863; pg. 354)
 Life Sketches of Government Officers and Members of the Legislature of the State of New York in 1875 by W. H. McElroy and Alexander McBride (pg. 74f) [e-book]
 POLITICAL; THE NOVEMBER ELECTION in NYT on October 30, 1870
 Religion in Politics in NYT on March 12, 1871
 NEW-YORK (listing the candidates for offices at the state election) in NYT on October 27, 1871
 DEATH LIST OF A DAY; Thomas A. Ledwith in NYT on April 5, 1898

External links

1840 births
1898 deaths
Democratic Party New York (state) state senators
Politicians from New York City
Democratic Party members of the New York State Assembly
New York (state) state court judges
Burials at Calvary Cemetery (Queens)
Lawyers from New York City
19th-century American politicians
19th-century American judges
19th-century American lawyers